The Kentucky Transportation Cabinet (KYTC) is Kentucky's state-funded agency charged with building and maintaining federal highways and Kentucky state highways, as well as regulating other transportation related issues.

The Transportation Cabinet is led by the Kentucky Secretary of Transportation, who is appointed by the governor of Kentucky. The current Secretary is Jim Gray, who was appointed by Democratic Governor Andy Beshear.

As of October 2012, KYTC maintains  of roadways in the state.

The KYTC mission statement is "To provide a safe, efficient, environmentally sound and fiscally responsible transportation system that delivers economic opportunity and enhances the quality of life in Kentucky."

Organization
The Transportation Cabinet is composed of four operating Departments, headed by Commissioners, and ten support offices, headed by Executive Directors. Those units are subdivided into Divisions headed by Directors.

Secretary
Deputy Secretary
Office of the Secretary
Office of Budget and Fiscal Management
Division of Accounts
Division of Purchases
Office of Audits
Division of Road Fund Audits
Division of Audit Services
Office for Civil Rights and Small Business Development 
Office of the Inspector General
Office of Human Resource Management
Division of Personnel Administration
Division of Employee Management
Division of Professional Development & Organizational Management
Office of Legal Services
Office of Support Services
Division of Facilities Support
Division of Graphic Design & Printing
Office of Public Affairs
Office of Information Technology
Office of Transportation Delivery
Department of Highways - responsible for designing and constructing state highways
Division of Program Management
Office of Project Development
Division of Planning
Division of Structural Design
Division of Highway Design
Division of Environmental Analysis
Division of Right of Way & Utilities
Division of Professional Services
Office of Project Delivery and Preservation
Division of Construction
Division of Materials
Division of Construction Procurement
Division of Equipment
Division of Traffic Operations
Division of Maintenance
Office of Highway Safety
Division of Incident Management
Division of Highway Safety Programs
Motorcycle Advisory Commission for Highway Safety (Attached to KYTC for Administrative purposes)
Motorcycle Safety Education Advisory Commission (Attached to KYTC for Administrative purposes)
District Offices 1-12
Department of Aviation - responsible for promoting the use and safety of Kentucky's airports
Capital City Airport Division
Greater Commonwealth Aviation Division
Kentucky Airport Zoning Commission (Attached to KYTC for Administrative purposes)
Department of Rural and Municipal Aid - provides aid and assistance for local governments to improve transportation infrastructure
Office of Local Programs
Kentucky Bicycle & Bikeway Commission (Attached to KYTC for Administrative Purposes)
Office of Rural and Secondary Roads
Department of Vehicle Regulation - oversees regulations for the use and operation of motor vehicles
Division of Motor Vehicle Licensing
Division of Motor Carriers
Division of Driver Licensing
Kentucky Motor Vehicle Commission (Attached to KYTC for Administrative Purposes)

Highway districts

KYTC organizes the state into twelve highway districts:

References

External links
Official website

Transportation in Kentucky
Transportation
State departments of transportation of the United States
Motor vehicle registration agencies
1912 establishments in Kentucky
Government agencies established in 1912